The Cinnamon Trust is a UK charity providing support for elderly and terminally ill people with pets. The organization relies on volunteers to walk dogs, transport pets, and foster pets whose owners have difficulty caring for them. It also administers pet sanctuaries. It was founded by Averil Jarvis and named after her corgi Cinnamon. The patrons of the charity are Paul McCartney and Virginia McKenna.

References

Charities based in the United Kingdom
Year of establishment missing
Animal charities based in the United Kingdom
Charities for the elderly based in the United Kingdom